The Akhuryan or Arpachay is a river in the South Caucasus. It originates in Armenia and flows from Lake Arpi, along the closed border with Turkey, forming part of the geographic border between the two states, until it flows into the Aras as a left tributary near Bagaran.

Gyumri, the second largest city of Armenia,  is located on the east bank of the river, which also flows past four of the twelve historical capitals of Armenia: Ani, Bagaran, Yervandashat and Yerazgavors.

History 

When the Byzantine army arrived in the province of Shirak in 1041, local Armenian nobles (nakharars) assembled together against them under the command of the Pahlavuni general Vahram Pahlavouni. Vahram then selected a body of 30,000 infantry and 20,000 cavalry, forming three divisions, which fought against the Byzantines. A battle ensued in which the invaders were routed with great slaughter. The fight was so ferocious that the effusion of blood flowing into the Akhurian River is said to have coloured its waters completely red.
The Byzantines left 21,000
dead behind. This victory allowed Vahram Pahlavuni along with Catholicos Petros Guedadarts to crown Gagik II king of Armenia and subsequently take the fortress of Ani, which had been in the hands of Vest Sarkis.

Bridges 
Several medieval bridges once existed over the Akhuryan. The bridge at Ani may date back to the Bagratuni Dynasty. More likely it dates to the thirteenth century. An inscription found nearby said that building work was done on the approach to the bridge in the early fourteenth century.

The bridge's single arch has fallen, leaving only tall abutments that were perhaps part of a fortified gate. Nineteenth-century travelers reported a guardhouse next to the bridge, but this has since disappeared.

Notes

References

See also 

 Geography of Armenia
 Geography of Turkey
 List of rivers of Armenia
 List of lakes of Armenia

Rivers of Armenia
Rivers of Turkey
International rivers of Europe
International rivers of Asia
Armenia–Turkey border
Geography of Shirak Province
Landforms of Kars Province